Agricultural Institute, Borujerd is a school and village in Shirvan Rural District, in the Central District of Borujerd County, Lorestan Province, Iran. At the 2006 census, its population was 170, in 42 families.

References 

Towns and villages in Borujerd County